Baguim do Monte is a civil parish in the municipality of Gondomar, Portugal. It was formed on July 11, 1985, by disintegration of territories of the parish of Rio Tinto. The population in 2011 was 14,102, in an area of 5.46 km². Together with the neighboring parish of Rio Tinto, it integrates the city of Rio Tinto.

Notable people
 André Silva (b.1995), a footballer who plays for the Portugal national football team and German club Eintracht Frankfurt.
 Ivo Rodrigues (b.1995), a footballer who plays for Belgian club Royal Antwerp F.C.

References

Freguesias of Gondomar, Portugal